Sabindra Shrestha (born 5 January 1992) is a footballer from Nepal. He made his first appearance for the Nepal national football team in 2012.

Career 
Shrestha is a defender, born in Pokhara. He attended the ANFA Academy and graduated in 2007. His career was put on halt due to a serious knee injury. He is known a determined defender who crosses and takes free kicks very well. He made his debut for Nepal during the 2012 AFC Challenge Cup.

References 

1992 births
Living people
People from Pokhara
Nepalese footballers
Nepal international footballers
Manang Marshyangdi Club players
Association football defenders